Varre-Sai (Sweep Before You Part) is a municipality located in the Brazilian state of Rio de Janeiro. Its population was 11,106 (2020) and its area is 189 km².

References

Municipalities in Rio de Janeiro (state)